Maikon Bonani (born January 29, 1989) is an American football placekicker from Brazil who is currently a free agent. He played college football for the South Florida Bulls.

Personal life
Born on January 29, 1989, to Marcia and Sidney Bonani, Maikon grew up in Matão, São Paulo, Brazil. When he was 11 years old, he moved from Brazil to the U.S. and lived in Lake Wales, in Polk County, Florida. Following in his footsteps, his brother Marcelo Bonani, is also a kicker for the Missouri State Bears,  and also aspires to get into the NFL. While working at Busch Gardens Tampa in 2009, Bonani plunged 10.6 meters (35 feet) off of the sky gondola ride Skyride. He sustained an injury to his 12th thoracic vertebra due to the fall.

College career
During his days in Lake Wales High School, he played both in junior and senior category as one of the main kickers with his personal best longest shot at a distance of 55 yards. In 2007, a Florida-based journal, the Lakeland Ledger, named him the male athlete of the year. He also got recognized as the football player of the year, the same year. After high school, he opted to study at University of South Florida. He also dabbled in tennis for three years.

Professional career
Bonani signed with the Tennessee Titans on May 10, 2013, as an undrafted free agent. On August 26, 2013, he was waived by the Titans.

References

External links 
 South Florida Bulls profile

1989 births
Living people
American football placekickers
Brazilian expatriate sportspeople in the United States
Brazilian players of American football
People from Matão
People from Lake Wales, Florida
Players of American football from Florida
South Florida Bulls football players
Sportspeople from Polk County, Florida
Tennessee Titans players
Sportspeople from São Paulo (state)